The Falling Star is a 1950 West German drama film directed by Harald Braun and starring Werner Krauss, Dieter Borsche and Gisela Uhlen. It was entered into the 1951 Cannes Film Festival. It was shot at the Bavaria Studios in Munich. The film's sets were designed by the art director Hans Sohnle.

Cast
 Werner Krauss as Lenura / Lenoir
 Dieter Borsche as Lucius / Luciano
 Gisela Uhlen as Lore Hollreiser
 Paul Dahlke as Viktor Hollreiser
 Angelika Meissner as Elisabeth Hollreiser (10 Jahre)
 Maria Wimmer as Elisabeth Hollreiser (erwachsen)
 Elfriede Kuzmany as Alma Waurich
 Renate Mannhardt as Trude
 Elisabeth Lindermeier as Sängerin
 Anna Lange as Alwine
 Lisa Helwig as Alte
 Theodolinde Müller as Frau Luschnat
 Gudrun Rabente as Inge
 Eva Vaitl as Heilsarmee-Offizierin
 Kurt Stieler as Vitus Aschenbach

References

Bibliography 
 Bock, Hans-Michael & Bergfelder, Tim. The Concise CineGraph. Encyclopedia of German Cinema. Berghahn Books, 2009.

External links

1950 films
1950 drama films
West German films
1950s German-language films
German drama films
German black-and-white films
Films directed by Harald Braun
Films shot at Bavaria Studios
1950s German films